Azusa station may refer to the following stations along Los Angeles Metro's L Line:

 Azusa Downtown station
 APU/Citrus College station